Al Luḩayyah (also known as Luhayyah, Loheia, Luhaiyah, or Loheiya) is a town on the Tihamah coastal plain, Yemen. The port lies 4 miles (6 km) southwest of Al Luḩayyah, partially protected by the offshore island of Al-Urmak.

History 
According to local tradition the town was founded at the dawn of the 15th century by a holy man, Sheikh Ali az-Zayla'i, a member of the Zayla'i family from the famed town of Zeila in Somalia. The interest in the local saint (who is buried in the local mosque) quickly attracted new settlers, and within a century, the unassuming town developed from around the mid-15th century into a bustling town, and a substantial center of the export trade in coffee.  By the end of the 18th century, the az-Zayla'i family was still regarded as a holy family and Al Luhayyah was a walled and well-fortified town.  It was under the direction of the Emir Farhan  when an expedition from Denmark visited the city and described their reception.

From about 1800 onwards Al Luḩayyah was a part of the Ottoman Empire, and in 1912 suffered damage during the Italo-Turkish War.  It was captured in 1918 in a joint attack by the British Navy and forces loyal to the Idrisi rulers of Asir, under whose control it remained until 1925 when it again came under Yemeni authority. It was seized in spring 1934 by the Saudis, who returned it however in the same year under the Treaty of Al-Ta'if.

The town was formerly a trading centre of significance but has declined in the last two centuries, especially as seaborne traffic has moved to more modern facilities at Ahmadi, the port of Al Hudaydah. The population is estimated at under 3,000.

Notes

External Links
Photos of al-Luhayya at the American Center of Research

Populated places in Al Hudaydah Governorate
Populated coastal places in Yemen
Port cities and towns of the Red Sea
History of Yemen